Autopsie Vol. 2 is a mixtape by Booba, released in 2007. It contains collorations with Cut Killer, Mala, Planète Rap, Cassie, Kennedy, Riddla, Dje, Rick Ross, Momma, 113 and others.

Track listing

 Intro
 Garcimore
 Le D.U.C.
 Freestyle Boulbi (Cut Killer Show)
 Mix-tape Evolution
 Tu M'Connais Pas - Mala
 Freestyle Ouais Ouais (Planète Rap)
 Me and You remix feat. Cassie
 All I Have - Naadei
 Du Biff - 92I
 Freestyle - Kennedy
 Nique sa Mère - Kennedy
 Mauvais Garçon remix feat. Riddla (971)
 Je Me Souviens (Freestyle)
 Quoi qu'il arrive feat. Dje
 Hustlin' remix feat. Rick Ross
 Ouest Side (freestyle)
 Remo (Bronx) feat. Momma
 Patrimoine du Ghetto (Intro)
 On Sait L'Faire feat. 113
 Boîte Vocale freestyle
 Monnaie dans l'Crane - Dje
 Tout et Tout d'Suite 
 Au Bout des Rêves (freestyle)
 Outro
 Le D.U.C. (instrumental)
 Du Biff (instrumental)
 Garcimore (instrumental)

Charts

External links 

 
 Blog
 MySpace
 Booba on Dailymotion

Booba albums
2007 mixtape albums
Sequel albums